Winesburg is an unincorporated community and census-designated place (CDP) in Paint Township, Holmes County, Ohio, in the United States. The population was 352 at the 2010 census. The community sits on the crest of a hill in the Amish country of Ohio, with a quaint downtown containing antique shops. It lies along U.S. Route 62.

It is not the setting of the novel Winesburg, Ohio by Sherwood Anderson, a collection of inter-related fictional short stories about citizens of a small town set in the early 20th century. (Clyde, Ohio, the town that Sherwood Anderson grew up in, is.)

History
The community was founded in 1829 and originally named Weinsberg, after Weinsberg in Germany. The spelling was changed to "Winesburg" by postal authorities in 1833 when a post office was opened there.

Geography
Winesburg is in the southeastern part of Paint Township, in northeastern Holmes County. The community sits on a ridge, with the north side draining toward the Middle Fork of Sugar Creek and the south side draining to Indian Trail Creek, a tributary of the South Fork of Sugar Creek. Via Sugar Creek, Winesburg is part of the Tuscarawas River watershed draining to the Ohio River.

U.S. Route 62, which runs through Winesburg as Main Street, leads northeast  to downtown Canton and southwest  to Millersburg, the Holmes county seat.

Demographics

References

Census-designated places in Holmes County, Ohio
Census-designated places in Ohio
German-American culture in Ohio
Amish in Ohio
1829 establishments in Ohio
Populated places established in 1829